The 2010 CBA Playoffs was the postseason for the Chinese Basketball Association's 2009–10 season. The playoffs started on March 24, 2010 with CCTV-5, and many local channels broadcasting the games in China. Eight teams qualified for the playoffs, all seeded 1 to 8 in a tournament bracket, with first and second round in a best-of-five format, and a final in a best-of-seven format.

Bracket
Teams in bold advanced to the next round. The numbers to the left of each team indicate the team's seeding in regular season, and the numbers to the right indicate the number of games the team won in that round. Home court advantage belongs to the team with the better regular season record; teams enjoying the home advantage are shown in italics.

Match details
All times are in China standard time (UTC+8)

Quarterfinals

(1) Guangdong Southern Tigers vs. (8) Bayi Rockets

(2) Xinjiang Flying Tigers vs. (7) Fujian Xunxing

(3) Zhejiang Lions vs. (6) Jiangsu Dragons

(4) Shanghai Sharks vs. (5) Liaoning Dinosaurs

Semifinals

(1) Guangdong Southern Tigers vs. (4) Shanghai Sharks

(2) Xinjiang Flying Tigers vs. (3) Zhejiang Lions

CBA Finals: (1) Guangdong Southern Tigers vs. (2) Xinjiang Flying Tigers

Notes and references

External links
Official Website 
Sina CBA Coverage

Chinese Basketball Association playoffs
playoffs